Since June 2010, rockets from the Falcon 9 family have been launched  times, with  full mission successes, one partial failure and one total loss of the spacecraft. In addition, one rocket and its payload were destroyed on the launch pad during the fueling process before a static fire test was set to occur.

Designed and operated by private manufacturer SpaceX, the Falcon 9 rocket family includes the retired versions Falcon 9 v1.0, v1.1, and v1.2 "Full Thrust" Block 1 to 4, along with the currently active Block 5 evolution. Falcon Heavy is a heavy-lift derivative of Falcon 9, combining a strengthened central core with two Falcon 9 first stages as the side boosters.

The Falcon design features reusable first-stage boosters, which land either on a ground pad near the launch site or on a drone ship at sea. In December 2015, Falcon 9 became the first rocket to land propulsively after delivering a payload into orbit. This reusability has resulted in significantly reduced launch costs. Falcon family core boosters have successfully landed  times in  attempts. A total of  boosters have flown multiple missions, with a record of 15 missions by the same booster.

Falcon 9's typical missions include cargo delivery and crewed flights to the International Space Station (ISS) with the Dragon and Dragon 2 capsules, launch of communications satellites and Earth observation satellites to geostationary transfer orbits (GTO), and low Earth orbits (LEO), some of them at a polar inclination. Launches to higher orbits have included the Deep Space Climate Observatory (DSCOVR) probe to the Sun–Earth Lagrange point L1, the Transiting Exoplanet Survey Satellite (TESS) space telescope on a lunar flyby trajectory, the Falcon Heavy test flight which launched Elon Musk's Tesla Roadster into a heliocentric orbit extending beyond the orbit of Mars, and Double Asteroid Redirection Test (DART) into the minor-planet moon Dimorphos of the double asteroid Didymos.

Launch statistics 
Additionally, one rocket and its payload AMOS-6 were destroyed before launch in preparation for an on-pad static fire test. The currently active version, Falcon 9 Block 5, has flown  missions, all full successes.

In 2022 Falcon 9 set a new record of 60 launches (all successful) by the same launch vehicle type in a calendar year. The previous record was held by Soyuz-U, which had 47 launches (45 successful) in 1979.

The first rocket version Falcon 9 v1.0 was launched five times from June 2010 to March 2013, its successor Falcon 9 v1.1 15 times from September 2013 to January 2016, and the Falcon 9 Full Thrust  times from December 2015 to present. The latest Full Thrust variant, Block 5, was introduced in May 2018. While the Block 4 boosters were only flown twice and required several months of refurbishment, Block 5 versions are designed to sustain 10 flights with just some inspections.

The Falcon Heavy derivative consists of a strengthened Falcon 9 first stage as its center core, with two additional Falcon 9 first stages attached and used as boosters, both of which are fitted with an aerodynamic nosecone instead of a usual Falcon 9 interstage.

A total of  re-flights of first stage boosters have all successfully launched their payloads.

Rocket configurations

Launch sites

Launch outcomes

Booster landings

Past launches

2010 to 2019

2020 
In late 2019, Gwynne Shotwell stated that SpaceX hoped for as many as 24 launches for Starlink satellites in 2020, in addition to 14 or 15 non-Starlink launches. At 26 launches, 14 of which were for Starlink satellites, Falcon 9 had its most prolific year, and Falcon rockets were second most prolific rocket family of 2020, only behind China's Long March rocket family.

2021 
In October 2020, Elon Musk indicated he wanted to be able to increase launches to 48 in 2021. Regulatory documents filed in February 2020, specified a maximum of 60 launches for Falcon 9 and another ten for Falcon Heavy from Florida, according to its 2020, environmental assessment.

2022 
In addition to launches from Vandenberg, SpaceX reflected up to 60 launches each year from its two Florida launch sites when it filed its environmental assessment in February 2020. In January 2022, information became public that SpaceX intended to increase the pace of launches to 52 during 2022, after launching a record 31 times in 2021. In March 2022, Elon Musk stated that SpaceX was aiming for 60 Falcon launches in 2022. In the event, SpaceX did increase their launch cadence, exceeding the previous yearly record of 31 launches in just the first 29 weeks of 2022. There were 61 Falcon launches in 2022: one Falcon Heavy and 60 Falcon 9. 13 of the Falcon 9 launches were from Vandenberg.

2023 

There have been, to date,  launches in 2023, while Elon Musk has said that the company will attempt to launch 100 rockets (may include Starship) this year. SpaceX had a rare coincidence of four rockets (all types of operational and under-development rockets) on all four of its orbital launch pads and two Dragon 2s (both types of Dragon 2s) on orbit on 10 January 2023.

Future launches 

Future launches are listed chronologically when firm plans are in place. The order of the later launches is much less certain, as the official SpaceX manifest does not include a schedule. Tentative launch dates are cited from various sources for each launch. Launches are expected to take place "no earlier than" (NET) the listed date. The number of Starlink satellites per launch indicated with an ~ is an expectation based on previous launches to the same orbit, as the exact number is rarely published more than three days in advance.

2023

2024

2025 and beyond

Notable launches

First flights and contracts 

On 4 June 2010, the first Falcon 9 launch successfully placed a test payload into the intended orbit. The second launch of Falcon 9 was COTS Demo Flight 1, which placed an operational Dragon capsule in orbit on 8 December 2010. The capsule re-entered the atmosphere after two orbits, allowing for testing the reentry procedures. The capsule was recovered off the coast of Mexico and then placed on display at SpaceX headquarters. The remaining objectives of the NASA COTS qualification program were combined into a single Dragon C2+ mission, on the condition that all milestones would be validated in space before berthing Dragon to the ISS. The Dragon capsule was propelled to orbit in May 2012, and following successful tests in the next days it was grabbed with the station's robotic arm (Canadarm2) and docked to the ISS docking port for the first time on 25 May. After successfully completing all the return procedures, the recovered Dragon C2+ capsule was put on display at Kennedy Space Center. Thus, Falcon 9 and Dragon became the first fully commercially developed launcher to deliver a payload to the International Space Station, paving the way for SpaceX and NASA to sign the first Commercial Resupply Services agreement for cargo deliveries.

The first operational cargo resupply mission to ISS, the fourth flight of Falcon 9, was launched in October 2012. But an engine suffered a loss of pressure at 76 seconds after liftoff, which caused an automatic shutdown of that engine, but the remaining eight first-stage engines continued to burn and the Dragon capsule reached orbit successfully and thus demonstrated the rocket's "engine out" capability in flight. Due to ISS visiting vehicle safety rules, at NASA's request, the secondary payload Orbcomm-2 was released into a lower-than-intended orbit. Despite this incident, Orbcomm said they gathered useful test data from the mission and later in 2014, launched more satellites via SpaceX. The mission continued to rendezvous and berth the Dragon capsule with the ISS where the ISS crew unloaded its payload and reloaded the spacecraft with cargo for return to Earth.

Following unsuccessful attempts at recovering the first stage with parachutes, SpaceX upgraded to a much larger first stage booster and with greater thrust, termed Falcon 9 v1.1, and performed a demonstration flight of this version in September 2013. After the second stage separation and delivering CASSIOPE, a very small payload relative to the rocket's capability, SpaceX conducted a novel high-altitude, high-velocity flight test wherein the booster attempted to reenter the lower atmosphere in a controlled manner and decelerate to a simulated over-water landing.

Loss of CRS-7 mission 

In June 2015, Falcon 9 Flight 19 carried a Dragon capsule on the seventh Commercial Resupply Services mission to the ISS. The second stage disintegrated due to an internal helium tank failure while the first stage was still burning normally. This was the first (and only as of February 2023,) primary mission loss for any Falcon 9 rocket. In addition to ISS consumables and experiments, this mission carried the first International Docking Adapter (IDA-1), whose loss delayed preparedness of the station's US Orbital Segment (USOS) for future crewed missions.

Performance was nominal until T+140 seconds into launch when a cloud of white vapor appeared, followed by rapid loss of second-stage LOX tank pressure. The booster continued on its trajectory until complete vehicle breakup at T+150 seconds. The Dragon capsule was ejected from the disintegrating rocket and continued transmitting data until impact with the ocean. SpaceX officials stated that the capsule could have been recovered if the parachutes had deployed; however, the Dragon software did not include any provisions for parachute deployment in this situation. Subsequent investigations traced the cause of the accident to the failure of a strut that secured a helium bottle inside the second-stage LOX tank. With the helium pressurization system integrity breached, excess helium quickly flooded the tank, eventually causing it to burst from overpressure. NASA's independent accident investigation into the loss of SpaceX CRS-7 found that the failure of the strut which led to the breakup of the Falcon-9 represented a design error. Specifically, that industrial grade stainless steel had been used in a critical load path under cryogenic conditions and flight conditions, without additional part screening, and without regard to manufacturer recommendations.

Full-thrust version and first booster landings 

After pausing launches for months, SpaceX launched on 22 December 2015, the highly anticipated return-to-flight mission after the loss of CRS-7. This launch inaugurated a new Falcon 9 Full Thrust version of its flagship rocket featuring increased performance, notably thanks to subcooling of the propellants. After launching a constellation of 11 Orbcomm-OG2 second-generation satellites, the first stage performed a controlled-descent and landing test for the eighth time, SpaceX attempted to land the booster on land for the first time. It managed to return the first stage successfully to the Landing Zone 1 at Cape Canaveral, marking the first successful recovery of a rocket first stage that launched a payload to orbit. After recovery, the first stage booster performed further ground tests and then was put on permanent display outside SpaceX's headquarters in Hawthorne, California.

On 8 April 2016, SpaceX delivered its commercial resupply mission to the International Space Station marking the return-to-flight of the Dragon capsule, after the loss of CRS-7. After separation, the first-stage booster slowed itself with a boostback maneuver, re-entered the atmosphere, executed an automated controlled descent and landed vertically onto the drone ship Of Course I Still Love You, marking the first successful landing of a rocket on a ship at sea. This was the fourth attempt to land on a drone ship, as part of the company's experimental controlled-descent and landing tests.

Loss of AMOS-6 on the launch pad 

On 1 September 2016, the 29th Falcon 9 rocket exploded on the launchpad while propellant was being loaded for a routine pre-launch static fire test. The payload, Israeli satellite AMOS-6, partly commissioned by Facebook, was destroyed with the launcher. On 2 January 2017, SpaceX released an official statement indicating that the cause of the failure was a buckled liner in several of the COPV tanks, causing perforations that allowed liquid and/or solid oxygen to accumulate underneath the COPVs carbon strands, which were subsequently ignited possibly due to friction of breaking strands.

Zuma launch controversy 

Zuma was a classified United States government satellite and was developed and built by Northrop Grumman at an estimated cost of US$3.5 billion. Its launch, originally planned for mid-November 2017, was postponed to 8 January 2018 as fairing tests for another SpaceX customer were assessed. Following a successful Falcon 9 launch, the first-stage booster landed at LZ-1. Unconfirmed reports suggested that the Zuma spacecraft was lost, with claims that either the payload failed following orbital release, or that the customer-provided adapter failed to release the satellite from the upper stage, while other claims argued that Zuma was in orbit and operating covertly. SpaceX's COO Gwynne Shotwell stated that their Falcon 9 "did everything correctly" and that "Information published that is contrary to this statement is categorically false". A preliminary report indicated that the payload adapter, modified by Northrop Grumman after purchasing it from a subcontractor, failed to separate the satellite from the second stage under the zero gravity conditions. Due to the classified nature of the mission, no further official information is expected.

Falcon Heavy test flight 

The maiden launch of the Falcon Heavy occurred on 6 February 2018, marking the launch of the most powerful rocket since the Saturn V, with a theoretical payload capacity to low Earth orbit more than double the Delta IV Heavy. Both side boosters landed nearly simultaneously after a ten-minute flight. The central core failed to land on a floating platform at sea. The rocket carried a car and a mannequin to an eccentric heliocentric orbit that reaches further than aphelion of Mars.

First crewed flights

On 2 March 2019, SpaceX launched its first orbital flight of Dragon 2 (Crew Dragon). It was an uncrewed mission to the International Space Station. The Dragon contained a mannequin named Ripley, which was equipped with multiple sensors to gather data about how a human would feel during the flight. Along with the mannequin was 300 pounds of cargo of food and other supplies. Also on board was Earth plush toy referred to as a "Super high tech zero-g indicator". The toy became a hit with astronaut Anne McClain, who showed the plushy on the ISS each day and also deciding to keep it on board to experience the crewed SpX-DM2.

The Dragon spent six days in space, including five days docked to the International Space Station. During the time, various systems were tested to make sure the vehicle was ready for US astronauts Doug Hurley and Bob Behnken to fly in it in 2020.

SpaceX held a successful launch of the first commercial orbital human space flight on 30 May 2020, crewed with NASA astronauts Doug Hurley and Bob Behnken. Both astronauts focused on conducting tests on the Crew Dragon capsule. Crew Dragon successfully returned to Earth, splashing down in the Gulf of Mexico on 2 August 2020.

Reuse of the first stage 

SpaceX has developed a program to reuse the first-stage booster, setting multiple booster reflight records:
 B1021 became, on 30 March 2017, the first booster to be successfully recovered a second time, on Flight 32 launching the SES-10 satellite. After that, it was retired and put on display at Cape Canaveral Air Force Station.
 B1046, the first Block 5 booster, became the first to launch three times, carrying Spaceflight SSO-A on 3 December 2018.
 B1048 was the first booster to be recovered four times on 11 November 2019, and the first to perform a fifth flight on 18 March 2020, but the booster was lost during re-entry.
 B1049 was the first booster to be recovered five times on 4 June 2020, six times on 18 August 2020, and seven times on 25 November 2020.
 B1051 became the first booster to be recovered eight times on 20 January 2021, nine times on 14 March 2021, and ten times on 9 May 2021, achieving one of SpaceX's milestone goals for reuse. It then became the first booster to be recovered eleven times on 18 December 2021, and twelve times on 19 March 2022.
 B1060 became the first booster to be recovered 13 times on 17 June 2022.
 B1058 became the first booster to be recovered 14 times on 11 September 2022, and 15 times on 17 December 2022..
 B1062 booster holds the record for fastest turnaround at 21 days. It launched on 8 April and again on 29 April 2022.

See also 
 List of failed SpaceX launches
 List of Falcon 1 launches
 List of Falcon 9 first-stage boosters
 List of SpaceX Dragon 1 missions
 List of SpaceX Dragon 2 missions
 List of Starlink launches
 List of SpaceX Starship flight tests

Notes

References 

Falcon 9
Falcon Heavy

Falcon 9
Articles containing video clips
SpaceX related lists